Óscar Uriel Macías Mora (born 9 July 1998) is a Mexican professional footballer who plays as a midfielder for Liga de Expansión MX club Tapatío, on loan from Liga MX club Guadalajara.

Club career

Youth
Macías joined Guadalajara's youth academy in 2014. He continued through Chivas Youth Academy successfully going through U-17, U-20 and C.D. Guadalajara Premier. Until finally reaching the first team, Matías Almeyda being the coach promoting macías to first team.

Guadalajara
Macías made his Liga MX debut on 22 October 2017 in a 3–2 win against Veracruz.

International career
Macías was called up by Jaime Lozano to participate with the under-23 squad at the 2019 Pan American Games, with Mexico winning the third-place match.

Honours
Guadalajara
CONCACAF Champions League: 2018

Mexico U23
Pan American Bronze Medal: 2019

References

External links
 
 Oscar Macías at Marca Claro: Professional Debut

1998 births
Living people
Footballers from Jalisco
Association football midfielders
Pan American Games medalists in football
Pan American Games bronze medalists for Mexico
Footballers at the 2019 Pan American Games
C.D. Guadalajara footballers
Atlético Zacatepec footballers
Lobos BUAP footballers
Atlético San Luis footballers
Medalists at the 2019 Pan American Games
Mexican footballers